William Stirling may refer to:

Sir William Stirling-Maxwell, 9th Baronet (1818–1878), Scottish historical writer
William Stirling (physiologist) (1851–1932), Scottish professor of physiology
William Stirling (British Army officer, born 1835) (1835–1906), British general
William Stirling (British Army officer, born 1907) (1907–1973), British general
William Stirling (footballer), (died 1914) Scottish footballer of the late 19th-century
William George Stirling (fl. 2018), physicist, 2018 winner of President's Medal of the IOP
William Stirling (Dunblane), architect

References

See also

William Sterling (disambiguation)
William Stirling-Hamilton (disambiguation)